Kemistry is the debut studio album by American singer Kem. It was released by Motown Records on February 25, 2003 in the United States. The album peaked at number 90 on the US Billboard 200 and was certified gold by the Recording Industry Association of America (RIAA) 16 months after its release with an excess of 500,000 copies sold. The song "Love Calls" was released as a single and reached number 25 on the US Hot R&B/Hip-Hop Songs.

Track listing
All songs written and produced by Kem.
 "Matter of Time" – 4:41
 "Miss You" – 4:27
 "Say" – 5:54
 "Inside" – 4:49
 "I'm Missin' Your Love" – 4:15
 "Love Calls" – 5:13
 "Brotha Man" – 3:59
 "Cherish This Moment" – 4:13
 "This Place (Dedicated to the Church of Today)" – 4:08
 "You Are" – 5:51

Personnel
Musicians
Kem: Vocals, Keyboards
Fred "Rodriguez" Robinson: Bass
Rayse Biggs: Trumpet
Edward Gooch: Trumpet
David McMurray: Tenor sax
Marlon "Wild Bill" Curry: Percussion
Andre "Zapp" Driscoll: Drums

Production
Executive Producer: Kem, Shante Paige
Arranged & Produced By Kem
Engineer: Chris Johnson
Mastering: Chris Athens
Mastering: Jonas Dainius Berzanskis

Charts

Weekly charts

Year-end charts

Certifications

References

Kem (singer) albums
2003 albums
Motown albums
Smooth jazz albums